Wuqi County is a county under the jurisdiction of Yan'an City, in the northwest of Shaanxi Province, China, bordering Gansu province to the southwest.

Administrative divisions
The county is divided into 1 subdistrict and 8 towns.

Geography 
Wuqi is adjacent to Dingbian County in the northwest, Zhidan County in the southeast, Jingbian County in the northeast, and Huachi County in Gansu Province in the southwest. The county's two main rivers are the Wuding River and the Beiluo River.

Climate 
The county has warm, wet summers, and cool, dry winters.

History
On October 19, 1935, forces belonging to the Chinese Soviet Republic captured the area. An account of Wuqi (Wu Ch'i, in Wade-Giles Romanization) in 1936 can be found in Edgar Snow's "Red Star over China". At the time, it was the main industrial center of the communist-controlled Shaanxi/Gansu/Ningxia borderlands area, This is where the Red Army's arsenal. cloth, uniform,  shoe and stockings factories were at the time. As Edgar Snow noted, the arsenal's products were mostly used to arm the Red guerilla fighters, while the regular Red Army units mostly used weapons captured from the enemy (Kuomintang and warlord) troops. The area was a part of the Shaan-Gan-Ning Border Region.

Economy 
As of 2016, Wuqi County had a GDP of 10.8 billion Renminbi. The county's urban residents had a per capita disposable income of 32,883 Yuan, and its agrarian residents had one of 11,538 Yuan.

Natural resources 
The county has deposits of a number of minerals, including coal, petroleum, and gypsum.

Transportation 
The county is home the Yan'an-Dingbian Road. The western terminus of the Yanwu Expressway is located in the county.

References

County-level divisions of Shaanxi
Yan'an